Amidophosphoribosyltransferase (ATase), also known as glutamine phosphoribosylpyrophosphate amidotransferase (GPAT), is an enzyme responsible for catalyzing the conversion of 5-phosphoribosyl-1-pyrophosphate (PRPP) into 5-phosphoribosyl-1-amine (PRA), using the amine group from a glutamine side-chain. This is the committing step in de novo purine synthesis. In humans it is encoded by the PPAT (phosphoribosyl pyrophosphate amidotransferase) gene. ATase is a member of the purine/pyrimidine phosphoribosyltransferase family.

Structure and function 

The enzyme consists of two domains: a glutaminase domain that produces ammonia from glutamine by hydrolysis and a phosphoribosyltransferase domain that binds the ammonia to ribose-5-phosphate. Coordination between the two active sites of enzyme give it special complexity.

The glutaminase domain is homologous to other N-terminal nucleophile (Ntn) hydrolases such as carbamoyl phosphate synthetase (CPSase). Nine invariant residues among the sequences of all Ntn amidotransferases play key catalytic, substrate binding or structural roles. A terminal cysteine residue acts as the nucleophile in the first part of the reaction, analogous to the cysteine of a catalytic triad. The free N terminus acts as a base to activate the nucleophile and protonate the leaving group in the hydrolytic reaction, in this case ammonia. Another key aspect of the catalytic site is an oxyanion hole which catalyzes the reaction intermediate, as shown in the mechanism below.

The PRTase domain is homologous to many other PRTases involved in the purine nucleotide synthesis and salvage pathways. All PRTases involve the displacement of pyrophosphate in PRPP by a variety of nucleophiles. ATase is the only PRTase that has ammonia as a nucleophile. Pyrophosphate from PRPP is an excellent leaving group, so little chemical assistance is needed to promote catalysis. Rather, the primary function of the enzyme appears to be bringing the reactants together appropriately and preventing the wrong reaction, such as hydrolysis.

Besides having their respective catalytic abilities, the two domains also coordinate with one another to ensure that all the ammonia produced from glutamine is transferred to PRPP and no other nucleophile than ammonia attacks PRPP. This is achieved mainly by blocking formation of ammonia until PRPP is bound and channelling the ammonia to the PRTase active site.

Initial activation of the enzyme by PRPP is caused by a conformational change in a "glutamine loop", which repositions to be able to accept glutamine. This results in a 200-fold higher Km value for glutamine binding Once glutamine has bound to the active site, further conformational changes bring the site into the enzyme, making it inaccessible.

These conformational changes also result in the formation of a 20 Å long ammonia channel, one of the most striking features of this enzyme. This channel lacks any hydrogen bonding sites, to ensure easy diffusion of ammonia from one active site to the other. This channel ensures ammonia released from glutamine reaches the PRTase catalytic site, and it differs from the channel in CPSase in that it is hydrophobic rather than polar, and transient rather than permanent.

Reaction mechanism 

The overall reaction catalyzed by ATase is the following:

  +  →  +  + PPi

Within the enzyme, the reaction is broken down into two half-reactions that occur at different active sites:

 →  + 
 +  →  + PPi

The first part of the mechanism occurs in the active site of the glutaminase domain and releases an ammonia group from glutamine by hydrolysis. The ammonia released by the first reaction is then transferred to the active site of the phosphoribosyltransferase domain via a 20 Å channel, where it then binds to PRPP to form PRA.

Regulation 
In an example of feedback inhibition, ATase is inhibited mainly by the end-products of the purine synthesis pathway, AMP, GMP, ADP, and GDP. Each enzyme subunit from the homotetramer has two binding sites for these inhibitors. The allosteric (A) site overlaps with the site for the ribose-5-phosphate of PRPP, while the catalytic (C) site overlaps with the site for the pyrophosphate of PRPP. The binding of specific nucleotide pairs to the two sites results in synergistic inhibition stronger than additive inhibition. Inhibition occurs via a structural change in the enzyme where the flexible glutamine loop gets locked in an open position, preventing the binding of PRPP.

Due to the chemical lability of PRA, which has a half-life of 38 seconds at pH 7.5 and 37 °C, researchers have suggested that the compound is channeled from Amidophosphoribosyltransferase to GAR synthetase in vivo.

Interactive pathway map

Gallery

References

Further reading

External links 
 
 

EC 2.4.2